Artists Alliance Gallery also known as Omanye House is an art centre in Ghana that exhibits the works of artists.

Background
The centre was established by  Ablade Glover. It is located at Labadi.

References

Artist-run centres
Art museums and galleries in Ghana